Cycloptera is a South American genus of bush crickets in the subfamily Pterochrozinae.

Species
, Orthoptera Species File lists:
 Cycloptera arcuata (Saussure & Pictet, 1898)
 Cycloptera aurantifolia (Stoll, 1787) - type species
 Cycloptera excellens Vignon, 1926
 Cycloptera falcifolia Walker, 1870
 Cycloptera speculata (Burmeister, 1838)

References

Pterochrozinae
Orthoptera of South America
Tettigoniidae genera